The 2012 Campeonato Baiano de Futebol was the 108th season of Bahia's top professional football league. The competition began on January 18 and ended on May 13. Bahia won the championship for the 44th time, while Camaçari and Itabuna were relegated.

Format
The championship has three stages. First stage, semifinals and finals. At first stage, the 12 teams play a double round-robin. The four best teams advance to the semifinals.

The champion and runner-up qualifies for the 2013 Copa do Brasil. The two worst teams are relegated. The best team that is not playing any Campeonato Brasileiro qualifies for the 2012 Campeonato Brasileiro Série D.

Participating Teams

First stage

Standings

Results

Final stage

Semifinals

First leg

Second leg

3–3 on aggregate. Vitória won on better first stage record 

1–1 on aggregate. Bahia won on better first stage record

Third place

First leg

Second leg

Feirense won 6–4 on aggregate.

Finals

First leg

Second leg

3–3 on aggregate. Bahia won on better first stage record.

Top scorers

References

Baiano
Campeonato Baiano